The Rambourg Foundation is a Tunisian nonprofit organization founded in 2011 by Olfa Terras and her husband Guillaume Rambourg. Originally founded as a charity in the United Kingdom, the foundation is based in Tunisia since 2015.

Objectives and mission
The mission of the Rambourg Foundation is to facilitate public access to arts and culture by promoting education, sports and handicrafts especially among young Tunisians.
The foundation works through its programs to develop a knowledge and creative economy with a special focus on the most remote areas of the country.

Projects and activities 

 The Rise of the Nation: Art at the Dawn of Modern Tunisia (1837-1881): an exhibition organised with the collaboration of the organized by the National Heritage Institute to shed lights on a forgotten period in the Tunisian modern history under the rules of the Beys, former kings of Tunisia.
 The Rambourg Foundation Prize for Contemporary Art.
 Inauguration of a cultural center of arts and crafts in Djebel Semmama located in the region of Kasserine to create better opportunities for young people.

Publications
The awakening of a nation, art at the dawn of modern Tunisia (1837–1881) under the direction of Ridha Moumni, November 2016.

References

External links
Rambourg Foundation Official website

Foundations based in Tunisia
Organizations established in 2011